
Gmina Bytnica is a rural gmina (administrative district) in Krosno Odrzańskie County, Lubusz Voivodeship, in western Poland.

The gmina contains part of the protected area called Gryżyna Landscape Park.

Villages
Gmina Bytnica contains the villages and settlements of Budachów, Dobrosułów, Drzewica, Garbowo, Głębokie, Grabin, Gryżyna, Kępiny, Pliszka, Smolary Bytnickie, Struga and Szklarka.

Neighbouring gminas
Gmina Bytnica is bordered by the gminas of Czerwieńsk, Krosno Odrzańskie, Łagów, Maszewo, Skąpe and Torzym.

References

Bytnica
Krosno Odrzańskie County